The Royal Ministry of Children and Families (short name Barne- og familiedepartementet; BFD) is a Norwegian government ministry that is responsible for family affairs, children welfare services, Church of Norway and other religious affairs, and consumer affairs. The ministry is led by the Minister of Children and Families Kjersti Toppe.

History
The ministry was established in 1956 as the Ministry of Family and Consumer Affairs. It is formally named Det kongelige barne- og familiedepartement (The Royal Ministry of Children and Families), although its short name Barne- og familiedepartementet (Ministry of Children and Families) is widely used except in formal documents, letters and affairs of state. It was merged with the Ministry of Pay and Prices in 1972 to form the Ministry of Consumer Affairs and Government Administration. It was reestablished as the Ministry of Family and Consumer Affairs in 1990 and renamed the Ministry of Children and Family Affairs in 1991. Between 2006 and 2019 the ministry held a succession of different names before returning to the name Ministry of Children and Family Affairs in 2019. As of 2021, its name is the Ministry of Children and Families.

Political staff
 Minister Kjersti Toppe (Centre Party)

Subordinate agencies
 Allocation Committee for support to voluntary children's and youth organizations
 County social welfare boards
 Ecolabelling Norway
 County Governors
 Market Council of Norway
 National Institute for Consumer Research
 Norway's Contact Committee for Immigrants and the Authorities
 Norwegian Assay Office
 Norwegian Consumer Council
 Norwegian Consumer Dispute Commission
 Norwegian Consumer Ombudsman
 Norwegian Directorate for Children, Youth and Family Affairs
 Norwegian Labour and Welfare Service
 Ombudsman for Children in Norway

See also
 List of Norwegian Ministers of Children and Family Affairs

References

External links

Children and Equality
Norway, Children, Equality and Social Inclusion
Norway, Children, Equality and Social Inclusion
Norway, Children, Equality and Social Inclusion
1956 establishments in Norway
Norway